Irina Igorevna Poltoratskaya (born 12 March 1979 in Antratsyt, Luhansk Oblast, Ukrainian SSR) is a Russian team handball player, playing on the Russian women's national handball team. She won gold medal with the Russian winning team in the 2005 World Women's Handball Championship in Saint Petersburg, Russia, and again in the 2007 World Women's Handball Championship in France.

Irina's career in Russia was stopped by a knee injury.  Anja Andersen, the coach of Slagelse Dream Team, Denmark brought Irina to Slagelse DT in 2004, and a few months later she underwent surgery and got a new meniscus.  The operation was successful, but only a year later did Irina return to the field.  Irina scored on penalties for Slagelse in the Champions League final, and she gave Anja Andersen her gold medal from the World Cup, as a thank you for helping her return to the world of handball.

Irina left Slagelse after some time and returned to the Russian national team (though a smaller role than before), where she ia.  played alongside Emiliya Turey, who she also played with when she played for Slagelse.

She is the wife of Russian handball player Timur Dibirov who plays for Macedonian club RK Vardar.

Individual awards
 MVP of 2007 EHF Women's Champions Trophy

References

External links

1979 births
Living people
People from Antratsyt
Russian female handball players
Russian people of Ukrainian descent
Handball players at the 2008 Summer Olympics
Olympic handball players of Russia
Olympic silver medalists for Russia
Olympic medalists in handball
Medalists at the 2008 Summer Olympics